Diplocladus kuwerti is a species of beetles in the subfamily Tillinae.

References 

 Gerstmeier, R.; Weiss, I. 2009: Revision of the genera Diplocladus Fairmaire and Strotocera Schenkling (Coleoptera: Cleridae, Tillinae). Zootaxa 2242: 1–54

External links 
 

Tillinae